"Volvo-Driving Soccer Mom" is a song by the alternative rock band Everclear, from their album Slow Motion Daydream (2003). The song was performed by Everclear lead singer Art Alexakis during his solo tour and was made the first single off Slow Motion Daydream.

Content
The song is about girls who use drugs and are sexually promiscuous in high school and college, but later grow up to be more conservative, suburban housewives when they decide it will be to their advantage. The lyrics allude to having a threesome and being busted for possession in the earlier part of the song, and describes the subjects' lives later on as "blonde, bland, middle-class Republican lives".

In an October 2003 interview with Songfacts, Alexakis explained the inspiration for "Volvo Driving Soccer Mom":

Music video
The video for the song features the story of a blonde wild child and former stripper who grows up to become a Volvo-driving soccer mom just like the song describes. In the video, scenes from her "checkered" past are intercut with scenes from her present life as a housewife to highlight the differences between the two. The video also features scenes of Everclear performing the song at a house party.

Australian CD single
"Volvo Driving Soccer Mom"
"Your New Disease"
"Happy"

Charts

See also
Volvo
Soccer mom

References

Everclear (band) songs
2003 singles
2002 songs
Music videos directed by Francis Lawrence
Songs written by Art Alexakis
Songs written by Greg Eklund
Songs written by Craig Montoya
Volvo Cars